Sanskar is an Indian television channel dedicated to broadcasting programs on the "Indian philosophy, religion, spiritual solidarity, and culture" and focuses more on devotion than spiritualism. The channel started broadcasting in June 2000 and in 2004 The Tribune reported it to have been gaining popularity over the then dominated entertainment and news channels on Indian television.

Through various spiritual discourse programmes the channel also focuses on younger generation. Discourses are given by various notable spiritual gurus like Sri Sri Ravi Shankar, Swami Ramdev, Jagadguru Kripalu Maharaj, Ramesh Oza, Swami Avdheshanand Giri and Morari Bapu. The shows include bhajans, kirtans and broadcasts from various pilgrimage places.

In 2016, Swami Ramdev and Acharya Balkrishna appointed Manoj Tyagi to head the Sales and marketing team of Sanskar TV and Satsang TV but soon in early 2017 he was elevated to the post of the CEO of Sanskar TV group. On 19 March 2018, Sanskar TV UK was launched on Sky platform for the viewers of Indian devotional content based in the United kingdom and Europe under the leadership of Manoj Tyagi.     

AWARDS & RECOGNITIONS

 The United Kingdom-based World Book of Records (WBR) felicitated Sankar TV channel for doing pioneering work in the field of spreading the ideas of sanatan dharm globally. The award was handed over by WBR CEO to Sanskar TV CEO Manoj Tyagi on April 29, 2022
 'Antarrashtriya Yoga Diwas Media Samman' (2019) for "Best Media Coverage of Yoga in Television" conferred to Sanskar TV on January 7, 2020, by the then Information and Broadcasting Minister Prakash Javadekar. 
 Sanskar TV was felicitated with 'Business Leader of the Year Award' for "Best Business Brand" presented by ET Now on February 16, 2020, in Mumbai.

History
Sanskar TV was launched in India in June 2000 and in the year 2010 the channel started broadcasting in the USA on DISH USA platform #721. In March 2018 Sanskar TV was made available to the viewers in the United Kingdom and Europe through the SKY platform #725.

References

External links 
 Sanskar TV website

Television stations in Mumbai
Religious television channels in India
Hindi-language television channels in India
Hindu television
Television channels and stations established in 2000